Tin Hla was a Lieutenant General in the Burmese army. He was also Deputy Prime Minister and Military Affairs Minister until November 2001.

Career 
Tin Hla was the Deputy Prime Minister of Myanmar and the Minister of Military Affairs during Than Shwe's regime. He also took the position of Quartermaster-General and led the 22nd Light Infantry Division in Burma during the 8888 uprising. He was also the founder and chairman of Myanmar Economic Corporation (MEC). He was forced to retire in 2001, accused of corruption, together with Lieutenant General Win Myint, the fourth-highest officer and Secretary 3 of the State Peace and Development Council. The purging of these two from power was believed to be an effort by Khin Nyunt the 9th Prime Minister of Burma (Myanmar) and his predecessor, Than Shwe. Khin Nyunt later underwent house arrest and those falsely charged of various accusations were revealed to the public. While some analysts think that the sacking of the two powerful figures was to improve the business climate, others think that it was a clean-out of hardliners unhappy with the possibility of comprises with Aung San Suu Kyi.  Lt Gen Tin Hla, being a Defence Services Academy graduate, is considered as Maung Aye's man.

Personal 

Tin Hla was born at Thaton, a town in Mon State, Lower Burma, in 1939. He is married to Daw Win Kyi and had four children.

References

Living people
1939 births
Burmese military personnel
Deputy Prime Ministers of Myanmar
People from Mon State